Melchiorre may refer to:

As first name
Melchiorre Barthel (1625–1672) German sculptor
Melchiorre Cafà (1636–1667), Maltese sculptor
Melchiore Cesarotti (1730–1808), Italian poet
Melchiorre Delfico (caricaturist) (1825–1895), Italian caricaturist
Melchiorre Delfico (economist) (1744–1835), Italian economist
Melchiorre Gherardini (1607–1668), Italian painter
Melchiorre Gioia (1767–1829), Italian philosopher and economist
Melchiorre Grimaldi (died 1512), Italian Bishop
Melchiorre Luise (1896–1967), Italian opera singer
Melchiorre Martelli, regent of San Marino
Melchiorre da Montalbano, Italian architect and sculptor
Melchiorre Murenu (1803–1854), Sardinian poet
Melchiorre Zoppio (1544–1634), Italian doctor and scholar

As surname
Daniela Melchiorre (born 1970), Italian magistrate and politician
Gene Melchiorre (1927–2019), American college basketball player
Luigi Melchiorre (born 1859), Italian sculptor

As second name